Hernan Medina (born 5 September 1974 in Argentina) is an Argentinean retired footballer.

References

Living people
1974 births
Argentine footballers
Argentine expatriate footballers
Association football defenders
General Paz Juniors footballers
Olimpo footballers
AEK Athens F.C. players
FC Lorient players
Boca Juniors footballers
Alumni de Villa María players
Sportivo Patria footballers
Club de Gimnasia y Esgrima La Plata footballers
Estudiantes de Río Cuarto footballers
Deportivo Maipú players
F.C. Motagua managers
Argentine expatriate sportspeople in Greece
Argentine expatriate sportspeople in France
Expatriate footballers in Greece
Expatriate footballers in France